The Klamath Falls Gems were a collegiate wood bat baseball team based in Klamath Falls, Oregon.  They began as an expansion team in the West Coast League in 2011 and played their home games at Kiger Stadium, which is also the home of the Oregon Tech Owls.  They were named after the former Class-D Far West League affiliate of the Philadelphia Phillies that played from 1948 to 1951.  They previously played in the Golden State Collegiate Baseball League from 2016 to 2017 and were members of the Great West League, having joined that league in October 2017 and played during the 2018 season.  They were without a league as the GWL suspended operations on October 4, 2018, and have eventually ceased operations themselves without notice.  The owner Joe O'Connor is being given until December 31, 2018, to renew the lease or the team will be considered defunct.

History
The Gems were founded in 2011 by a group of local sports personalities including longtime Oregon Tech Owls men's basketball coach and athletic director Danny Miles, Howard Morris, Don Gresdel and Eric Baker.   They named Chuck Heeman as the team's inaugural general manager.   They were named for the original Klamath Falls Gems that played in the original Far West League from 1948 to 1951.

Front office staff
 Joe O'Connor - Owner
 Nick Winstead - Assistant General Manager
 DJ Harryman - Marketing Intern

Broadcasting
All games, home and away, were broadcast live on KLAD-AM 960 & FM 99.3 ESPN Radio and streamed live at the station's website.

Year-by-year records

West Coast League

Golden State Collegiate Baseball League

Great West League

References

External links
 Klamath Falls Gems official website
 Great West League official website

Klamath Falls, Oregon
Amateur baseball teams in Oregon
2011 establishments in Oregon
Baseball teams established in 2011